UofL Health is a fully integrated regional academic health system based in Louisville, Kentucky formed by the reorganization of KentuckyOne Health in conjunction with the acquisition of that system by the University of Louisville from Catholic Health Initiatives in 2019. The resulting health care system combined University of Louisville Hospital and the various hospitals and medical centers of KentuckyOne under one management umbrella.

UofL Health's affiliation with the University of Louisville School of Medicine joins academic physicians who lead medical advancements through research in laboratories, at the bedside, and in the community. They are responsible for educating not only medical students and physicians in training but also practicing physicians through lectures, journal publications, and conferences that disseminate cutting-edge medical knowledge broadly.

References

External links
 UofL Health – UofL Hospital, in Louisville, Kentucky, 346 beds; Level I trauma center
 UofL Health – Jewish Hospital, in Louisville, Kentucky, 462 beds
 UofL Health – Mary & Elizabeth Hospital, in Louisville, Kentucky, 331 beds
 UofL Health – Peace Hospital, in Louisville, Kentucky, 220 beds; behavioral health care hospital
 UofL Health – Shelbyville Hospital, in Shelbyville, Kentucky, 70 beds
 UofL Health – Frazier Rehabilitation Institute, in Louisville, Kentucky, 135 beds; inpatient and outpatient rehab hospital
 UofL Health – Brown Cancer Center; in Louisville, Kentucky; nationally-recognized, comprehensive cancer program
 UofL Health - Medical Center East, in Louisville, Kentucky
 UofL Health - Medical Center Northeast, in Louisville, Kentucky
 UofL Health - Medical Center South, in Shepherdsville, Kentucky
 UofL Health - Medical Center Southwest, in Louisville, Kentucky

Hospitals in Kentucky
Healthcare in Kentucky
Medical and health organizations based in Kentucky
Companies based in Louisville, Kentucky